The 8th African Muzik Magazine Awards ceremony was held on 12 December 2021, virtually with the theme, "Flavors of Africa". The awards celebrated African music and African artists. The nominees were announced on 4 October 2021. Burna Boy, Diamond Platnumz and Tayc received the most nominations with six each, ahead of Wizkid, Fally Ipupa and Dadju, who were tied for the second-most nominations with five nods each.

Winners and nominees 
Nominees and winners are as listed below.

References 

2021 music awards
2021 in Africa